Jospin Nshimirimana (born 12 December 2001) is a Burundian professional footballer who plays as a midfielder for Turkish club Yeni Malatyaspor and the Burundi national team.

Club career

Burundi 
Born in Mutimbuzi, Burundi, Nshimirimana began playing football at the age of eight, and his father enrolled him at the local club New Regime. From there, he went on to play at Delta Star in the lower divisions of Burundian football. They achieved promotion into the Burundi Premier League for the 2017–18 season. Although they finished the season in last place, Nshimirimana led his team to a runner-up finish in the 2018 Burundian Cup. He scored a goal in the 4–0 semi-final victory over Olympique Star, who finished fifth in the league.

Nshimirimana made the move to Aigle Noir Makamba in the summer before the 2018–19 season. They won their first-ever league title that year, in addition to winning their first domestic treble after also capturing the Burundian Cup and Super Cup as well as the second-ever Coupe de l'Unité.

Yeni Malatyaspor 
On 2 January 2021, in the final day of the winter transfer window, Turkish Süper Lig side Yeni Malatyaspor announced the signing of Nshimirimana on a three-and-a-half-year contract.

International career
Nshimirimana represented his country at the 2019 Africa U-20 Cup of Nations in Niger, as well as the qualifiers for the tournament the year prior.

He made his senior international debut on 27 July 2019, coming on for Landry Ndikumana in the second half of a match against South Sudan during 2020 African Nations Championship qualification. He scored in the 82nd minute of the 2–0 victory. He received his next call-up ahead of the 2020 Bangabandhu Cup hosted by Bangladesh in January 2020. He scored a hat-trick in their opening match against Mauritius on January 16, which they won 4–1 after conceding the first goal. He added a goal in Burundi's victory over Seychelles two days later, then put up another hat-trick in their semi-final upset of the host team Bangladesh on 23 January. Although they lost in the finals to Palestine, Nshimirimana was named player of the tournament after leading all scorers with seven goals.

Career statistics

International

Scores and results list Burundi's goal tally first.

Honours
Aigle Noir Makamba
 Burundi Premier League: 2018–19
 Burundian Cup: 2019
 Burundian Super Coupe: 2019
 Coupe de l'Unité: 2020

Individual
 Bangabandhu Cup Best Player: 2020
 Bangabandhu Cup top scorer: 2020

References

External links
 
 
 

Living people
2001 births
People from Bujumbura Rural Province
Burundian footballers
Association football midfielders
Yeni Malatyaspor footballers

Burundi youth international footballers
Burundi under-20 international footballers
Burundi international footballers
Burundian expatriate footballers
Burundian expatriate sportspeople in Turkey
Expatriate footballers in Turkey